Aëcio Morrot Coelho (3 May 1925 – 14 March 1984) was a Brazilian modern pentathlete and equestrian. He competed at the 1948 Summer Olympics.

References

External links
 

1925 births
1984 deaths
Brazilian male equestrians
Brazilian male modern pentathletes
Olympic equestrians of Brazil
Olympic modern pentathletes of Brazil
Equestrians at the 1948 Summer Olympics
Modern pentathletes at the 1948 Summer Olympics
20th-century Brazilian people